Opsilia coerulescens is a gray coloured species of a beetle from family  longhorn beetle, subfamily Lamiinae.

Development
They feed on Echium species, including Echium vulgare and Echium italicum.

Subspecies
Phytoecia coerulescens coerulescens (Scopoli, 1763)
Phytoecia coerulescens cretensis Breuning, 1947

References

External links
BioLib Taxon profile — druh kozlíček kovolesklý Phytoecia coerulescens (Scopoli, 1763)

coerulescens
Beetles described in 1763
Taxa named by Giovanni Antonio Scopoli